Dichomeris torrefacta is a moth in the family Gelechiidae. It was described by Edward Meyrick in 1914. It is found in South Africa.

The wingspan is 14–15 mm. The forewings are ochreous yellow suffused throughout with brownish ferruginous. The hindwings are grey.

References

Endemic moths of South Africa
Moths described in 1914
torrefacta